Mérk is a village in Szabolcs-Szatmár-Bereg county, in the Northern Great Plain region of eastern Hungary.

Geography 

This area is part of Szabolcs-Szatmár-Bereg county located in the northeast corner of Hungary. In 2012, Mérk had 2073 inhabitants. The number of houses in the community was 817. The village is close to the border between Hungary and Romania that crosses this area in an East to West direction at the River Kraszna. Geographically, the area constitutes a juncture of the sandy Nyírség Plain and the marshlands of Ecsed.

Art relics and tourist attractions in the village
 The Roman Catholic Church was erected in 1882-84 in honour of St. Peter and St. Paul (eclectic)
 The Protestant Church was erected between 1899 and 1914 (eclectic)
 The memorial that was erected in honor of the people died in World War II; it is located in the space between the two churches
 The tawdry barns (German folklore buildings)
 A collection of hunter József Janovszky's trophy collection.

Notes 

Populated places in Szabolcs-Szatmár-Bereg County